Fairview Shores is a census-designated place and an unincorporated area in Orange County, Florida, United States. The population was 10,239 at the 2010 census. It is part of the Orlando–Kissimmee–Sanford, Florida Metropolitan Statistical Area.

Geography
Fairview Shores is located at  (28.598727, -81.390785).

Demographics

At the 2000 census there were 13,898 people, 5,879 households, and 3,333 families in the CDP.  The population density was 1,372.4/km (3,550.8/mi²).  There were 6,326 housing units at an average density of 624.7/km (1,616.3/mi²).  The racial makeup of the CDP was 78.09% White, 13.28% African American, 0.36% Native American, 2.72% Asian, 0.11% Pacific Islander, 3.14% from other races, and 2.30% from two or more races. Hispanic or Latino of any race were 9.43%.

Of the 5,879 households 26.7% had children under the age of 18 living with them, 37.1% were married couples living together, 14.6% had a female householder with no husband present, and 43.3% were non-families. 31.6% of households were one person and 11.2% were one person aged 65 or older.  The average household size was 2.33 and the average family size was 2.97.

The age distribution was 23.1% under the age of 18, 7.8% from 18 to 24, 34.3% from 25 to 44, 20.8% from 45 to 64, and 14.0% 65 or older.  The median age was 36 years. For every 100 females, there were 97.1 males.  For every 100 females age 18 and over, there were 93.4 males.

The median household income was $35,399 and the median family income  was $41,570. Males had a median income of $31,203 versus $26,221 for females. The per capita income for the CDP was $19,918.  About 9.4% of families and 13.6% of the population were below the poverty line, including 20.0% of those under age 18 and 9.5% of those age 65 or over.

References

Unincorporated communities in Orange County, Florida
Census-designated places in Orange County, Florida
Greater Orlando
Census-designated places in Florida
Unincorporated communities in Florida